Sir George Bolster Owens (1808 – 1897) was an Anglo-Irish politician.

Owens was born in New Barracks, Limerick, the son of the barrack master George Owens. He was educated at the University of Glasgow, graduating as a Doctor of Medicine in 1850. He chaired the "General Meeting of the members and friends of the Irish Society for Women's Suffrage" on 21 February 1872 organised by Anna Haslam. Owens was the Irish Unionist Lord Mayor of Dublin in 1876, during which time he was knighted. Owens was a Justice of the Peace for the city and was Sheriff of Dublin City in 1881.

He married Rebecca Anna Letitia Owen, daughter of Major William Owen, in 1831.

References

1808 births
1897 deaths
19th-century Anglo-Irish people
Alumni of the University of Glasgow
Irish justices of the peace
Irish Unionist Party politicians
Knights Bachelor
Lord Mayors of Dublin
Politicians from Limerick (city)
High Sheriffs of Dublin City